Max Himmelheber (24 April 1904 in Karlsruhe, Baden – 17 December 2000, Baiersbronn, Baden) was a German inventor and Luftwaffe fighter pilot.

Biography 
In 1932, Himmelheber invented particle board.

During the Second World War Himmelheber served as pilot in the fighter unit Jagdgeschwader 2. During the Battle of Britain he was a leutnant and technical officer of Stab.I/JG 2 (staff flight of the I group of JG 2). He had one victory on 30 August 1940, over an RAF Hurricane near Goudhurst. He was shot down himself on 6 September 1940, over Staplehurst, Kent, and became a POW at Woolwich Hospital.

References

External links 
 

20th-century German inventors
Luftwaffe pilots
1904 births
2000 deaths
Engineers from Karlsruhe
Military personnel from Karlsruhe